Cicindela parowana, the dark saltflat tiger beetle, is a species of flashy tiger beetle in the family Carabidae. It is found in North America.

Subspecies
These three subspecies belong to the species Cicindela parowana:
 Cicindela parowana parowana Wickham, 1905
 Cicindela parowana platti Cazier, 1937 (platt tiger beetle)
 Cicindela parowana wallisi Calder, 1922 (Wallis' tiger beetle)

References

Further reading

 
 

parowana
Articles created by Qbugbot
Beetles described in 1905